Gone Ain't Gone is Tim Fite's second album, his first for the ANTI- label.  Many of the sounds on this record are sampled from CDs "rescued" from the dollar bins in used record stores.  A music video for "Away from the Snakes" was released in September 2006.

Track listing 
"I Hope Yer There" (3:26)
"Toasted Rye" (1:04)
"No Good Here" (3:34)
"Eating at the Grocery Store with William" (1:49)
"Forty-Five Remedies" (3:33)
"I've Kept Singing (feat. Paul Robeson)" (1:25)
"Not a Hit Song" (3:51)
"Took a Wife" (2:23)
"Shook" (3:42)
"If I Had a Cop Show" (0:46)
"Flowers-Bloom" (1:43)
"A Little Bit" (3:11)
"Disgrace" (0:39)
"Mascara Lies" (2:37)
"Time Comes Around" (0:55)
"Away from the Snakes" (3:52)
"The More You Do" (10:02)
"On the Line" (Japanese bonus track) (3:15)

Personnel
Tim Fite – vocals, guitar
Danielle Stech Homsy – baritone ukulele (on Track 4)
Justin Riddle – drums (on Track 17)
Bonfire Madigan Shive – cello (on Track 17)
Ben Kweller – 12-string guitar (on Track 17)

References

External links
Gone Ain't Gone on ANTI- Records' website

2005 albums
Tim Fite albums
Anti- (record label) albums